Brian Delate (born April 8, 1949) is an American actor.

He was born in Trenton, New Jersey, to Joseph and Patricia Delate, and was primarily raised in Bucks County, Pennsylvania.
 
Delate served in the Vietnam War before entering a career in acting.

Brian is best known worldwide for portraying Walter Moore/Kirk Burbank in the 1998 Paramount film The Truman Show.

Delate lives in California.

Filmography

External links
 

1949 births
Living people
Place of birth missing (living people)
American male film actors
20th-century American male actors